Oliver Petersch (born 26 April 1989 in Bitburg) is a German footballer who played in the 2. Bundesliga.

Career 

Petersch began his career at the reserve side of Bayer 04 Leverkusen, but couldn't break into the club's first team. He was loaned out to Rot-Weiß Oberhausen in 2009, where he established himself as a regular in the 2. Bundesliga. After his loan spell, Petersch did not return to Leverkusen, but transferred to Eintracht Braunschweig instead. After 14 games in his initial season with the team, he missed the entire first half of the 2012–13 season due to injury. He finally returned from injury on 2 February 2013 in a league game against SC Paderborn 07, in which he also scored his first goal for Braunschweig. His contract in Braunschweig was not renewed after the 2012–13 season and Petersch went on to join Arminia Bielefeld. He was released by Bielefeld after one season with the club.

References

External links 
 

1989 births
Living people
People from Bitburg
Footballers from Rhineland-Palatinate
German footballers
Germany youth international footballers
Association football midfielders
2. Bundesliga players
Bayer 04 Leverkusen II players
Rot-Weiß Oberhausen players
Eintracht Braunschweig players
Eintracht Braunschweig II players
Arminia Bielefeld players